Bartolomé Jiménez Patón (1569–1640) was a Spanish humanist, rhetorician, grammarian and writer.

Spanish Roman Catholic priests
Spanish male writers
Spanish humanists
People from the Province of Ciudad Real
1569 births
1640 deaths
University of Salamanca alumni